The George Taft House is a historic house at 153 Richardson Street in Uxbridge, Massachusetts. The two-story timber-frame house was built in c. 1810.

Taft Benson, Sr, a famous Mormon Pioneer, lived in the house from 1817 to 1835. It is a well-preserved example of Federal-style architecture, expressed mainly in its door surround, which includes pilasters and a broken pedimented gable above a half-round transom window. In the middle of the 19th century it was the home of George Washington Taft, a farmer and local state representative.

On October 7, 1983, it was added to the National Register of Historic Places.

See also
National Register of Historic Places listings in Uxbridge, Massachusetts

References

External links
 George Taft House MACRIS Listing

Houses in Uxbridge, Massachusetts
National Register of Historic Places in Uxbridge, Massachusetts
Houses on the National Register of Historic Places in Worcester County, Massachusetts
Federal architecture in Massachusetts